Duperouzel is a surname. Notable people with the surname include:

 Aimable Duperouzel (1831–1901), French-born convict transported to Western Australia
 Bruce Duperouzel (born 1950), Australian rules footballer and cricketer
 Gary Duperouzel, Australian cricket umpire

French-language surnames